Waiting for the Moon is the sixth studio album (or the eighth if including the soundtracks Nenette et Boni and Trouble Every Day) by Tindersticks.  Recorded between September 2001 and January 2003 at Great Linford Manor, Eastcote and various home studios, the long-player was released on the Beggar's Banquet label in 2003.  This was the last Tindersticks album to feature the band's original lineup before their extended hiatus and subsequent departure of half the band. Tindersticks member David Boulter later selected it as his least favorite Tindersticks album, remarking: "It has a feeling of something that was lost—the feeling that the band hadn't been great for a couple of albums."

Track listing
 "Until the Morning Comes" (Hinchliffe, Tindersticks) – 3:34
 "Say Goodbye to the City" (Staples, Hinchliffe, Tindersticks) – 4:30
 "Sweet Memory" (Hinchliffe, Tindersticks) – 4:29
 "4.48 Psychosis" (Words by Sarah Kane, from her play, 4.48 Psychosis, Tindersticks) – 5:13
 "Waiting for the Moon" (Staples, Hinchliffe) – 2:51
 "Trying to Find a Home" (Staples, Hinchliffe, Boulter, Tindersticks) – 5:44
 "Sometimes It Hurts" (Staples, Tindersticks) – 4:39
 "My Oblivion" (Staples, Tindersticks) – 7:00
 "Just a Dog" (Staples, Boulter, Tindersticks) – 3:28
 "Running Wild" (Staples, Tindersticks) – 4:14

Personnel
Stuart Staples – vocals, guitar
David Boulter – keyboards
Neil Fraser – guitar
Dickon Hinchliffe – violin
Mark Colwill – bass
Alistair Macaulay – drums

Additional musicians
Gina Foster – vocals
Colin McCan – timpanis
Terry Edwards – trumpet (on track 2)
Lhasa de Sela – vocal duet (on track 7)
Steve Sidwell – trumpet
Neil Sidwell – trombone
Jamie Talbot – tenor saxophone
Deve Bishop – baritone saxophone
Lucy Wilkins, Calina De La Mare, Gillon Cameron, Anna Morris, Howard Gott, Ruth Gottlieb, Christopher Koh, Jacqueline Norrie,  Louise Peacock, Wendy de St. Pear, Fiona Brice, Brian Wright, Catherine Browning, Sarah Button, David Williams – violins
Robert Spriggs, Naomi Fairhurst, Emily Frith, Fiona Griffith, Vincent Greene, Sophie Sirota, Rebecca Ware, Reiad Chibahm Lucy Theo – violas
Sarah Wilson, Andrew Nice, Chris Mansell, Oliver Kraus, Chris Worsey, Ian Burdge – cellos

Production
Stuart Staples, Ian Caple – production
Sam Miller, Antti Uusimaki, Haicong Guo – assistants
Dickon Hinchliffe – arranger (strings and brass)
Tim Young – mastering (at Metropolis, London)
Suzanne Osborne – cover painting

Notes
Both Canadian and Australian editions came with a bonus EP entitled Don't Even Go There. It included the tracks "Trying to Find a Home" (Boulter, Tindersticks), "Sexual Funk" (Boulter), "Everything Changes" (Boulter, Tindersticks) and "I Want You" (Hinchliffe, Tindersticks). This EP was released as a standalone single in the UK.

References

2003 albums
Tindersticks albums
Beggars Banquet Records albums